ND-1 may refer to:
 North Dakota's 1st congressional district
 Namco ND-1 ARCADE GAME PCB